11th Nova Scotia general election may refer to:

Nova Scotia general election, 1818, the 11th general election to take place in the Colony of Nova Scotia, for the 11th General Assembly of Nova Scotia
1906 Nova Scotia general election, the 33rd overall general election for Nova Scotia, for the (due to a counting error in 1859) 34th Legislative Assembly of Nova Scotia, but considered the 11th general election for the Canadian province of Nova Scotia